Football Club Sangiuliano City, commonly known as Sangiuliano City or simply Sangiuliano, is an Italian association football club from San Giuliano Milanese, Lombardy.

History 
The club was founded in 2021 after the Luce family, previously owning amateur club Città di Sangiuliano (founded in 1968 as Società Sportiva Borgolombardo), which they led from Seconda Categoria to Eccellenza, acquired Serie D club NibionnOggiono and relocated it to San Giuliano Milanese under the new denomination of Sangiuliano City Nova; for their debut season, due to Italian Football Federation regulations involving relocated clubs, they had to play their home games in Nova Milanese.

In their debut season in the Serie D, Sangiuliano City, captained by 40-year old Manuel Pascali, immediately won promotion to Serie C.

Current squad

Out on loan

Honours
 Serie D
 Winners: 2021–22 (Group B),

References

External links
Official website

Football clubs in Lombardy
Association football clubs established in 2021
Serie C clubs
Serie D clubs
2021 establishments in Italy